Horton Township may refer to:

In Canada
 Horton Township, Nova Scotia

In the United States
 Horton Township, Osceola County, Iowa
 Horton Township, Michigan
 Horton Township, Stevens County, Minnesota
 Horton Township, Elk County, Pennsylvania

Township name disambiguation pages